Kan Mori (森　寛, died 7 May 1944) was a rear admiral in the Imperial Japanese Navy. He was from Okayama. He was killed in the last months of World War II.

He was a graduate of Naval Academy Etajima Class 48, on 16 July 1920.

Assignments
On 1 December 1932, Lt. Mori Kan was appointed Commanding Officer of Second Class Destroyer IJN Wakatake. He held this command until 15 November 1934.

Death
Kan Mori was killed in action 7 May 1944.

The Japanese Dōmei news agency reported on 22 September 1944 that he had “died in action” but gave no details.

The dispatch, recorded by a Federal Communications Commission monitor, said that the Yokosuka naval station, near Tokyo, had listed him as a fatality.

References

Japanese admirals of World War II
Date of birth missing
1944 deaths
Japanese military personnel killed in World War II